Fanendo Adi (born 10 October 1990) is a Nigerian footballer who plays as a striker.

Club career

Europe
Following his transfer from AS Trencin, Adi scored a goal in his F.C. Copenhagen debut against FC Vestsjælland on 25 August, despite not having his work and residency permit.

In January 2011, Adi, then 20 years old, was invited for a trial by Ajax for the second time.

Portland Timbers
On 13 May 2014, Adi went on loan with the option to buy to Portland Timbers of Major League Soccer. He made his debut coming on as a substitute against Columbus Crew and got the game tying assist, a feat which earned him a start in the following match. In his first start for the club, on 28 May 2014 against Chivas USA, Adi scored his first and second goals for the club. On 7 June he received his second start and scored two goals in the first half against Real Salt Lake.

Adi was signed permanently by the Portland Timbers on 23 June 2014. He became the club's fourth ever Designated Player. He was the top scorer with 18 goals in both 2015 and 2016.  On 8 April 2017, after scoring a penalty kick against the Philadelphia Union, Adi became the Timbers' all-time leading goalscorer, with 46 goals.

FC Cincinnati

Adi was traded from Portland Timbers to MLS expansion side FC Cincinnati on 30 July 2018 for a deal worth up to $1,000,000 in allocation money. He played the remainder of the 2018 season with FC Cincinnati in the United Soccer League ahead of the club's move up to Major League Soccer.

Adi started in the first three matches of FC Cincinnati's inaugural MLS season. However, in the third match on 17 March (Cincinnati's home opener against Portland Timbers), he was injured after a collision with Larrys Mabiala late in the first half, and was subbed out at halftime. He remained on the bench with a left ankle injury the next two matches.

At approximately 3:45am on 31 March 2019, Adi was pulled over by the Ohio State Highway Patrol and cited for operating a vehicle under the influence of alcohol (OVI), speeding, and not possessing a valid driver's license. According to the police, Adi was driving 102 mph in a 65 mph zone, showed a blood alcohol content of 0.124 in a breathalyzer test, and possessed only a Ukrainian driver's license. Adi was suspended by FC Cincinnati and entered MLS' Substance Abuse and Behavioral Health program.

Adi was cleared from suspension on 24 April and began practicing with the team the following day; however, his minutes remained limited as his ankle was still recovering. He made his first appearance since the injury in the final 11 minutes of a San Jose Earthquakes match on 4 May. He played another 26 minutes as a substitute in the following two matches. On 25 May, Adi started for the first time since 17 March and played a full 90 minutes.

Adi scored his first goal of 2019 in a U.S. Open Cup match against Louisville City FC on 12 June. He scored his first goal in the 2019 MLS season on July 13 against the Chicago Fire. It gave FC Cincinnati the lead and victory, 2–1.

Following a tumultuous season with Cincinnati, Adi was waived by the club on 17 January 2020, ahead of the 2020 season.

Columbus Crew
On 27 January 2020, Columbus Crew SC announced that it had claimed Adi off the Major League Soccer Waiver List. Adi's contract with Columbus expired following their 2020 season.

Minnesota United
Minnesota United FC signed Adi to a one-year deal with a one-year option on 27 August 2021.

International career
Adi was called up to Nigeria's U23 team twice in 2011. He was also called up to the senior Nigeria squad to face Egypt in a 2017 Africa Cup of Nations qualifier in March 2016 but did not play.

Coaching
In February 2023, Adi was named head coach for the Minnesota United Academy U-19 team.

Honors
Portland Timbers
MLS Cup: 2015
Western Conference championship (in playoffs): 2015

FC Cincinnati 
 USL regular season: 2018
Columbus Crew 
 MLS Cup: 2020

References

External links

 
 
 
 

1990 births
Living people
Nigerian footballers
Nigerian expatriate footballers
Expatriate footballers in Slovakia
Expatriate footballers in Ukraine
Nigerian expatriate sportspeople in Ukraine
Expatriate men's footballers in Denmark
Expatriate soccer players in the United States
Nigerian expatriate sportspeople in Slovakia
Nigerian expatriate sportspeople in Denmark
Association football forwards
AS Trenčín players
FC Metalurh Donetsk players
FC Dynamo Kyiv players
SC Tavriya Simferopol players
F.C. Copenhagen players
Portland Timbers players
FC Cincinnati players
Columbus Crew players
Minnesota United FC players
Slovak Super Liga players
Ukrainian Premier League players
Danish Superliga players
Major League Soccer players
Designated Players (MLS)
USL Championship players
Nigerian expatriate sportspeople in the United States
Minnesota United FC non-playing staff